Howards' Way is a television drama series produced by BBC Birmingham and transmitted on BBC1 between 1 September 1985 and 25 November 1990. The series deals with the personal and professional lives of the wealthy yachting and business communities in the fictional town of Tarrant on the south coast of England, and was filmed on the River Hamble and the Solent. 

The series was notable for its pioneering camerawork onboard yachts, often filming multiple yachts racing in choppy waters and high winds, and its extensive location shooting mainly on the south coast of Britain. Most of the location filming for the series was carried out in Bursledon, Hamble, Swanwick, Warsash, Hill Head, Lee-on-the-Solent, Lymington, Hythe, Southampton and Fareham—all in Hampshire. The Jolly Sailor pub in Bursledon featured in several episodes. 

All interiors were filmed in Studio A at the now-demolished BBC Pebble Mill studios in Edgbaston, Birmingham. Extensive two-storey sets were constructed inside the studio (the Howards and the Urquhart homes were both functioning two-floor sets). The smaller Studio B (used for regional news) was also occasionally used as an on-screen fashion photography studio. Other areas of the large 1970s TV and radio complex (opened in 1971) were used for the many board room scenes in the series, with long corridors and lifts sometimes doubling as a busy hospital and meeting rooms became lavish corporate hospitality suites. 

The whole series is being rerun on UKTV channel Drama since 2 January 2023.

History
Howards' Way was created and produced by Gerard Glaister and Allan Prior, with lead writer Raymond Thompson as story and script consultant—at a point in the BBC's history when the organisation was making a concerted populist strike against ITV in its approach to programming. The series debuted on BBC1 in 1985, the same year that the BBC launched its first ongoing soap opera EastEnders as a challenge to the ratings supremacy of ITV's Coronation Street. The first series, which aired in 1985, was a slow burner. It wasn't until the BBC repeated it in the summer of 1986 as the lead-in to the second series that Howards' Way became a huge hit. Its scheduling with new comedy series Bread, which launched in 1986, and followed it on a Sunday evening, saw both programmes achieve huge viewing figures for the BBC. Although Howards' Way is commonly cited as an attempt to provide a British alternative to glossy American sagas such as Dallas and Dynasty, it also acts as a continuation of plot themes explored in a previous Glaister series, The Brothers, which involved a family's personal and professional crises running a road haulage firm, and embraced several soap opera touches in its characterisations and storylines.

The original working title for the series was "The Boatbuilders", which was ultimately rejected when it was felt that it sounded like a documentary series and wouldn't grab viewers' attention.

The theme music was composed by Simon May and performed by his orchestra. Executive Leslie Osborne secured a co-writer credit, but in reality did not contribute to the composition. After series one, Don Black was commissioned to write lyrics for the theme; May had suggested the title "Almost There", which Black changed to "Always There". The song was recorded by Marti Webb, and reached number 13 in the UK singles chart. The upbeat variation of the theme, "Barracuda", was used over the show's end credits from series 3 (until the show's ended), and was a "re-visitation" of a section of May's song "Believe" for his musical Smike.

Inspired by a storyline in Howards' Way, Gerard Glaister went on to create Trainer (1991–1992), set in the world of horse-racing, and also featuring several of the same cast members.

Plot

The protagonists in the early episodes are the titular Howard family—Tom (Maurice Colbourne), wife Jan (Jan Harvey) and grown-up children Leo (Edward Highmore) and Lynne (Tracey Childs). Tom is made redundant from his job as an aircraft designer after twenty years and is unwilling to re-enter the rat race. A sailing enthusiast, he decides to pursue his dream of designing and building boats, putting his redundancy pay-out into the ailing Mermaid boatyard, run by Jack Rolfe (Glyn Owen), a gruff traditionalist, and his daughter Avril (Susan Gilmore). Tom immediately finds himself in conflict with Jack, whose reliance on alcohol and whose resentment of Tom's new design ideas threaten the business, but has an ally in Avril, who turns out to be the real driving force behind the yard with her cool, businesslike brain. Jan, who has spent the last twenty years raising the children and building the family home, is less than impressed by her husband's risky new venture, and finds herself pursuing her own life outside the family through establishing a new marine boutique whilst working for Ken Masters (Stephen Yardley).

Other major characters introduced during the first series are Kate Harvey (Dulcie Gray), Jan's sensible and supportive mother, the millionaire businessman Charles Frere (Tony Anholt) and the wealthy but unhappy Urquhart family. Gerald (Ivor Danvers) is the right-hand man of Charles Frere. Polly (Patricia Shakesby), a friend of Jan, is a bored corporate wife preoccupied with preserving her social status, and their daughter Abby (Cindy Shelley) is a socially awkward young woman who has returned to Tarrant after completing her education at a Swiss finishing school and who establishes a friendship with Leo Howard. Unlike the comparatively close and secure Howard family, the Urquharts have secrets to hide. Gerald and Polly's marriage is a sham—an arrangement to cover the fact that Gerald is bisexual, to give him respectability in the business world and give a name to Abby, Polly's illegitimate daughter after an affair at university. Abby herself is pregnant, after a brief relationship in Switzerland.

The series combined standard melodramatic storylines involving family drama, romance and extramarital affairs (Tom and Avril, Jan and Ken) with business-related plots of corporate intrigue and scheming for power, climaxing with an end-of-series cliffhanger.

Reception
Although derided by critics as a cheesy melodrama, Howards' Way nevertheless proved to be a hugely popular programme for the BBC, both domestically and in overseas sales. While the series was unable to compete with the likes of Dallas and Dynasty in terms of opulence, its stylistic aspects did develop as it went on, with the staging of powerboat races and fashion shows, and extensive location filming in Guernsey, Malta and Gibraltar as the storylines dictated.

A number of new characters were also introduced later in the series, such as Sarah Foster (Sarah-Jane Varley), a glamorous business partner for Ken Masters, Sir Edward Frere (Nigel Davenport), the rich tycoon father of Charles Frere, Orrin Hudson (Jeff Harding), the American father of Abby Urquhart's baby, Emma Neesome (Sian Webber), a beautiful engineer who came to work with Tom Howard and Jack Rolfe at the Mermaid yard, and Vanessa Andenberg (Lana Morris), an elegant widow and old flame of Jack Rolfe. Midway through the show's run, Charles is revealed to be Abby's biological father. In a parallel with Dynasty, actress Kate O'Mara, who had previously starred in The Brothers and had also appeared in the American supersoap as Caress Morrell, was also brought in, to play ruthless businesswoman Laura Wilde.

During the production of the fifth series, lead actor Maurice Colbourne, who played central character Tom Howard, suddenly died from a heart attack during a break in filming. Episode nine featured his last appearance with the remaining episodes hurriedly rewritten to explain the character's absence. He was finally killed off at the beginning of the sixth and final series, commissioned to end the programme and to tie up all the storylines. The final episode of Howards' Way was transmitted on 25 November 1990.

Boats
Central to the plot were three yachts - The Flying Fish, a Laser 28; Barracuda of Tarrant, the prototype of the Sadler Barracuda 45, and Spring of Tarrant, the prototype of the MG Spring 25. Both the Barracuda and Spring were designed by Tony Castro.

Main cast list

Series overview

DVD releases

The show is rated  PG  for Parental Guidance in Australia and  PG  in New Zealand for violence and coarse language.

In other media 
A medley of the theme songs from Howards' Way and EastEnders was recorded by the Shadows and reached No. 86 on the UK singles chart in December 1986.

References

External links

Howards' Way @ TV.com
A recording of the theme tune

1985 British television series debuts
1990 British television series endings
1980s British drama television series
1990s British drama television series
BBC television dramas
BBC Birmingham productions
British television soap operas
English-language television shows
Nautical television series
Television shows set in Hampshire
Television series by BBC Studios